Ephialtes is a genus of ichneumon wasps in the family Ichneumonidae. There are about 14 described species in Ephialtes.

Species
These 14 species belong to the genus Ephialtes:

 Ephialtes arisanus Sonan, 1936 c g
 Ephialtes brevis Morley, 1914 c
 Ephialtes brischkei Dalla Torre, 1901 c g
 Ephialtes decumbens (Townes, 1960) c g
 Ephialtes duplicauda Heinrich, 1949 c g
 Ephialtes facialis Brischke, 1865 c g
 Ephialtes hokkaidonis Uchida, 1928 c g
 Ephialtes longicornis (Pfeffer, 1913) c g
 Ephialtes macer Cresson, 1868 c g
 Ephialtes manifestator (Linnaeus, 1758) c g
 Ephialtes sodomiticus Westwood, 1838 c g
 Ephialtes taiwanus (Uchida, 1928) g
 Ephialtes tenchozanus Sonan, 1936 c g
 Ephialtes zirnitsi Ozols, 1962 c g

Data sources: i = ITIS, c = Catalogue of Life, g = GBIF, b = Bugguide.net

References

Further reading

External links

 

Pimplinae